WOCV-CD (channel 35) is a low-powered, Class A television station in Cleveland, Ohio, United States, airing programming from the digital multicast network Decades. The station is owned and operated by Weigel Broadcasting, and its transmitter is located in Parma, Ohio.

WOCV-CD broadcasts under a Class A television license, and has some cable carriage, most notably on Charter Spectrum - channel 15 in Cleveland and channel 13 in Akron.

History 
W29AI channel 29 was originally licensed on July 14, 1987, and did not sign on until 1990. It became WAOH-LP on August 21, 1995, and WAOH-CD on December 30, 2014. A translator of WAOH, W35AX channel 35, was licensed on November 30, 1989, and signed on in 1996.

As part of the digital transition, WAOH-CD flash-cut their signal to digital in December 2014, remaining on channel 29. W35AX signed on their digital companion signal on channel 16 on March 16, 2015, with the calls W16DO-D. The new coverage area for W16DO-D overlapped most of viewing area formerly served by WAOH-CD. The station's branding made use of the new frequency allocation, changing from "29/35" to "16/29" on station IDs.

WAOH-CD went off the air on October 25, 2017 as part of the FCC's digital repack. This shifted W16DO-D's role from translator to the sole transmitter for the station. On June 28, 2020, W16DO-D transitioned to their repacked frequency of RF channel 27, with the new callsign W27EA-D. Its virtual channel reverted to the previous 35 allocation, rather than 16, 27, or 29.

In March 2022, Media-Com petitioned the FCC to allow a sale of the station to Weigel Broadcasting. The sale included only W27EA-D, not WNIR. On June 20, 2022, the sale was completed, and W27EA-D switched its primary affiliation to Story Television.

Prior to Weigel Broadcasting taking control of the station, W27EA-D was affiliated with Retro TV. Under Media-Com's ownership, the station aired a few locally produced programs (such as the Son of Ghoul). Before Retro TV, it was affiliated with the America One network, with the branding of "The CAT" (for "Cleveland Akron Television"). Prior to its America One affiliation, the station had carried Bloomberg Television, MuchMusic, and Network One.

On September 1, 2022, Weigel Broadcasting filed to change the call letters from W27EA-D to WOCV-CD. The new call letters took effect on September 20, 2022.

On November 1, 2022, the Weigel owned Decades network began airing on 35.1, with Story TV moved to the newly activated 35.2.

On March 27, 2023 Decades will become Catchy Comedy, a classic sitcom focused network.

Subchannels 
The station's digital signal is multiplexed:

References

External links 
 

Story Television affiliates
OnTV4U affiliates
Kent, Ohio
Television channels and stations established in 1996
Low-power television stations in the United States
OCV-CD
Weigel Broadcasting
1996 establishments in Ohio
Decades (TV network) affiliates